Joseph Emile Renier (1887–1966) was an American traditionalist artist and professor, best known as a sculptor and medalist. He created architectural sculptures, reliefs, and medals and was active in the New York City and New Jersey area.

Biography 
Joseph Emile Renier was born in 1887 in Union City, New Jersey. He studied at the Art Students League of New York with George Bridgman. In 1915 Renier won the Prix de Rome to study at American Academy in Rome, and he studied in Brussels with Victor Rousseau. During World War I, Renier served with the American Red Cross in Italy and returned to the United States by 1921.

Renier taught life drawing at Yale University for 14 years, and taught architecture courses at New York University.

For the 1939 New York World's Fair, Renier created a large sculpture, Speed (created between 1935 and 1945) featuring a stylized, all white figure on a winged horse. 

He won many honors and awards for his work, including the Samuel F. B. Morse Medal, the Elizabeth N. Watrous Gold Medal for Sculpture, American Artists Professional League gold metal, and the Daniel Chester French Medal of the National Academy of Design.

Death and legacy 
Renier died after a short illness on October 8, 1966, at Wickersham Hospital in New York City. He was survived by his wife Margaret Renier (née Carey) and their daughter.

His work is included in many public museum collections including National Gallery of Art, Smithsonian American Art Museum, Rhode Island School of Design Museum, the Cleveland Museum of Art, Yale University Art Gallery, the Metropolitan Museum of Art, among others.

References 

American metalsmiths
American male sculptors
Artists from New York City
Art Students League of New York alumni
New York University faculty
People from Union City, New Jersey
1887 births
1966 deaths
Yale School of Art faculty